The 2018 USAC AMSOIL National Sprint Car Championship is the 63rd season of sprint car racing sanctioned by USAC. The 2018 season will feature 45 races on dirt tracks across the United States. The season will begin with Winter Dirt Games at Bubba Raceway Park on February 15, and will end with the Oval Nationals at Perris Auto Speedway on November 10.

Team & Driver Chart 
This chart reflects confirmed and cited team & driver combinations only.

Driver & Team Changes 
 Dave Darland will team up with Goodnight Racing for the 2018 USAC AMSOIL National Sprint Car Championship. Darland has previously raced for the team in recent years. Darland will run car #36D while using Maxim chassis & Claxton engines.
 - Dooling/Hayward Motorsports formed an alliance with Richard Childress Racing to team up for the 2018 season with entries in USAC's P1 Insurance National Midget Championship & AMSOIL National Sprint Car Championship. Brady Bacon will race for the championship in both Midget & Sprint Car series for the team. Following the first 3 races at Ocala, the Dooling/Hayward sprint car effort was put on hiatus. 
 - Kevin Thomas Jr. will move to Hoffman Auto Racing to race the #69 Mean Green car for the 2018 season.
 - Ryan Newman has formed a partnership with Clauson/Marshall Racing to form their new sprint car team (Clauson/Marshall/Newman Racing). Tyler Courtney will run for the team in 2018 in the #7BC car.
 - Justin Grant will move to TOPP Motorsports to run the entire USAC Sprint Car schedule in 2018.
 - Kyle Cummins has joined Eberhardt/Zirzow Racing for the 2018 season.
 - Brady Bacon will chase the rest of the USAC championship in his own equipment starting at Lawrenceburg in March. 
 - Following the Indiana Sprint Week race at Kokomo, Chad Boespflug moved his #98 team to a part-time basis on the USAC Sprint Car tour.

Schedule
The 2018 schedule for the USAC AMSOIL National Sprint Car Championship features 45 races (solely on dirt ovals) across 13 states. The entire season will have on-demand video coverage by Loudpedal.TV. MavTV (in association with Speed Sport) will broadcast the Weedsport race on delay. Select races will be broadcast live online by Speed Shift TV. The Cushion will broadcast the races at Knoxville & BAPS. DIRTvision.com will broadcast the #LetsRaceTwo weekend at Eldora. Eldora Speedway will broadcast the 4 Crown Nationals live on their streaming website. 

 - * will state if the race is a non points event.
 - ≠ will state if the race was postponed or canceled

Schedule notes and changes
 - 1 new round & 2 new tracks were added on the Eastern Storm tour, those include Bridgeport Speedway & Weedsport Speedway. However, Lincoln Speedway will not returning to Eastern Storm schedule in 2018.
 - Tri-City Speedway & Federated Auto Parts Raceway at I-55 both return to the schedule in 2018 after last year's races were washed out at both venues.
 - Lake Ozark Speedway is another new venue added to the 2018 calendar, and will run in October as a doubleheader weekend with Lakeside.
 - the March 31 race at Lawrenceburg Speedway was canceled due to saturated grounds & poor weather conditions. 
 - the April 21 race at Montpelier Motor Speedway was canceled due to weather conditions. 
 - Night #1 of the River Town Showdown at Tri-City Speedway (May 18) was rained out. The race has been rescheduled for August 31.
 - Night #2 of the River Town Showdown at Federated Auto Parts Raceway at I-55 (May 19) was rained out. The race has been rescheduled for September 1. 
 - USAC announced on June 4 that Plymouth Speedway would be hosting the opening round of Indiana Sprint Week. 
 - USAC announced on June 7 that a race has been added to the schedule at Gas City I-69 Speedway, it will be held on September 7. 
 - Night #3 of the Sprint Car Smackdown at Kokomo Speedway (August 25) was postponed to September 9th due to rain.

Results and Standings

Races

See also
 2018 USAC P1 Insurance National Midget Championship
 2018 USAC Silver Crown Series

References

USAC AMSOIL National Sprint Car Championship
United States Auto Club